Bradys Lake is a rural locality in the local government area (LGA) of Central Highlands in the Central LGA region of Tasmania. The 2016 census recorded a population of 53 for the state suburb of Bradys Lake.

History 
Bradys Lake is a confirmed locality. 

Originally the settlement was called Bradys Gate, but in 1951 it was changed to Bradys Marsh, which later became Bradys Lake.

Geography
The Nive River forms the western boundary. The waters of Lake Binney form part of the southern boundary and those of Bronte Lagoon part of the northern.

Road infrastructure 
Route A10 (Lyell Highway) runs through from north to south.

References

Towns in Tasmania
Localities of Central Highlands Council